Sammy Jackson is a Canadian jazz and rhythm and blues singer from St. Catharines, Ontario, whose 2020 EP With You won the Juno Award for Vocal Jazz Album of the Year at the Juno Awards of 2021.

Jackson, who studied vocal performance at the University of Toronto, released her debut EP, Take Me Back, in 2016.

References

External links

21st-century Black Canadian women singers
Canadian women jazz singers
Canadian jazz singers
Canadian rhythm and blues singers
Musicians from St. Catharines
Juno Award for Vocal Jazz Album of the Year winners
Living people
Year of birth missing (living people)